Dictynomorpha is a genus of Asian cribellate araneomorph spiders in the family Dictynidae, and was first described by S. A. Spassky in 1939.  it contains only two species: D. daemonis and D. strandi.

References

Araneomorphae genera
Dictynidae
Spiders of Asia